Polaris Peak is a rounded peak (970 m) rising 4 nautical miles (7 km) southwest of Mount Roth in the Gabbro Hills, Queen Maud Mountains. So named by the Southern Party of New Zealand Geological Survey Antarctic Expedition (NZGSAE) (1963–64) because they drove a Polaris motor toboggan to the summit.

Mountains of the Ross Dependency
Dufek Coast